Frank Hartmann (born 17 August 1960 in Hanover) is a retired German football player.

Career

Born in Hanover on 17 August 1960, Hartmann displayed his club loyalty from a very young age. During his childhood he spent 13 years as a striker for TSV Havelse, before joining the Reds in 1980. At Hannover he spent five years as part of Biskup's "rascals". As the Reds were hoping for promotion in season 1984–85, Hartmann earned the reputation as the "tragic hero". He scored the deciding goal in the 2–0 victory over Hertha Berlin to earn his team their first promotion in nine years. Yet Hartmann was not fully able to enjoy the occasion. He turned out for the following season, but not for 96. His transfer to FC Bayern Munich had already been agreed before this decisive match.

He spent the season as a bench-warmer at the Munich club and made the switch back to the Reds a season later – where their delight at their "prodigal son" returning was obvious. In the meantime, Hannover had suffered relegation once again, but in season 1985–86 Hartmann was able to help his club back into the top league. His jubilation, though, was short lived; he suffered a ruptured cruciate ligament and had to abruptly end his career.

In the years afterwards he turned out for SG Wattenscheid, after which his former coach, Werner Biskup, convinced him to make a comeback with VfL Osnabrück. Despite his impressive 12 goals in 32 games, VfL narrowly missed out on promotion.  Hartmann, however, remained loyal to football following the end of his professional career: After a further stop at FC 1975 Damla Genc, he became player manager at his home club TSV Havelse between 1998 and 2000. At the same time he also worked in the Sport Coordination office at Hannover 96.

Hartmann was the most successful Hannover 96 striker of the mid-80s. In the first and second Bundesliga he played a total of 206 games wearing the famous red shirt – scoring 53 goals. While playing nowadays for celebrity teams, Hartmann has also combined his passion for sport with his job. Along with his colleague, Karsten Surmann, he founded the "Soccer & Racket Park" – a sports park where you can play football, squash and badminton. And since 2006 Frank Hartmann and his wife have been running the Hotel and Restaurant Pinkenburg in Wennigsen.

References

Honours
 DFB-Pokal winner: 1985–86
 Bundesliga champion: 1985–86

External links
 

German footballers
Hannover 96 players
FC Bayern Munich footballers
SG Wattenscheid 09 players
VfL Osnabrück players
Bundesliga players
2. Bundesliga players
1960 births
Living people
Association football forwards
TSV Havelse players
TSV Havelse managers
Footballers from Hanover